4D SAS is a French company owned by Laurent Ribardière. 4D has a US-based subsidiary 4D Inc. 4D was founded in 1984 when development began for Silver Surfer (early codename for 4D) and had its initial product release in 1987 with its own Programming Language. It is the developer and publisher of 4D (or 4th Dimension) and the original developer of Wakanda.

References

Business software companies
Development software companies
Software companies of France
French companies established in 1984
Software companies established in 1984
Computer companies established in 1984